Garegin Khachatryan (17 September 1975 – 2 September 1995) was an Armenian sculptor, artist, and freedom fighter.

Biography
Garegin Khachatryan was born in Yerevan, 17 September 1975.
Son of Rafik Khachatryan - Khachar Afo - who was a sculptor of the Union of the Artists of the USSR and Armenia and a young (13 years old) and brave participant of the National Liberation movement of Armenians: he was a Soldier of Armenian National Liberation Legion (Azgayin Legion or National Legeon, from 1988, aged thirteen, to 1994 when he was 19 years old. He was a "spetsnaz" and paratrooper in a volunteer battalion "Artsiv 4" (Eagle 4). His father Rafik Khachatryan was in the Headquarters of the Independence Army of Armenia.
Garegin Khachatryan graduate of an Armenian High school, as well as of Art College in Yerevan.
He was a volunteer in the self-defense forces and had a good training in volunteer troops as a special force and paratrooper.
He was a brave defender of the borders of Armenia and a volunteer participant of self-defense operations in the border areas of Armenia and Nagorno Karabakh.

He was awarded with the "Medal for Bravery" of Armenia.

Freedom fighter and composer Davit Amalyan (David Amalian) in late September 1995 dedicated a great song to Garegin Khachatryan.

He was a direct descendant of the house of Daniel-Bek of Sassun (province Sassun or Sason of Western Armenia) (second half of the 18th century) and Khachatur-Bek of Mush (town Mush of Western Armenia) (first half of the 19th century).

References
 Encyclopedia of Karabakh Liberation War 1988-1994 (in Armenian). Armenian Encyclopedia, Yerevan 2004, pages 429–430. 
 Television programmes of Armenian TV channels. 1998, August.
 Television programmes of Armenian TV channels. 1998, November.
 Television programmes of Armenian TV channels. 2006, May.
 Television programmes of Armenian TV channels. 2006, September.
 Television programmes of Armenian TV channels. 1998–2006.
 "Hay Zinvor" (Armenian Soldier), the official weekly of the Ministry of Defense of Armenia, issues of 1998–2008.
 Sasun Grigoryan, Musanera ch'lrecin, v.3, Yerevan, 2010, pages 67–67 (in Armenian).
 Хачатрян Гарегин Рафикович, Энциклопедия фонда Хай Азг()

External links
 «Ռաֆոն» 
 Garegin Khachatryan in Yandex.ru 
 
 . Ղարաբաղյան ազատագրական պատերազմ հանրագիտարան (Karabakh Liberation War encyclopedia).djvu/429
 . Ղարաբաղյան ազատագրական պատերազմ հանրագիտարան (Karabakh Liberation War encyclopedia).djvu/430

Resources 

1975 births
1995 deaths
Military personnel from Yerevan
Armenian military personnel of the Nagorno-Karabakh War
20th-century sculptors
Armenian military personnel killed in action